The Vice Governor of Mato Grosso do Sul is the second-highest position in the executive branch of the government of Mato Grosso do Sul, after the Governor of Mato Grosso do Sul, and ranks first in the state's governmental succession. 

It has the function of replacing the Governor in case of travel abroad or impediments and to succeed him in case of resignation, death or removal from office by specific process. He must also give advice to the Governor, if requested.

The term of office of the vice-governor of Mato Grosso do Sul is four years with the right to run for consecutive re-election, if chosen again by the governor. Upon taking office, he takes an oath to uphold and defend the federal and state constitutions, national and state laws, the integrity of the Union and the independence of the country. The Vice Governor is automatically elected along with the Governor every four years, with no votes being cast directly for him, being elected on a slate basis. This system was implemented to prevent the lieutenant governor from being from the governor's opposition party.

Despite the state being installed in 1979 with the inauguration of Harry Amorim Costa, the position of lieutenant governor was only made official with the first state elections in Brazil after more than two decades, in 1982. With his absence, the president of the Legislative Assembly was next in line of succession.

List of Vice Governors

Living Former Vice Governors 
To date, seven former vice-governors are alive. In order of service are:

 George Takimoto, served from 1987-91
 Braz Melo, served from 1995-99
 Moacir Kohl, served from 1999—2003
 Egon Krakheche, served from 2003—2007
 Murilo Zauith, served from 2007—2011 and 2019—2023
 Simone Tebet, served from 2011—2015
 Rose Modesto, served from 2015—2019

References 

Government of Mato Grosso